Ernest Lee McAnally (born August 15, 1946) is an American retired professional baseball player. A right-handed pitcher, McAnally spent four seasons (1971–1974) in Major League Baseball as a member of the Montreal Expos.

Originally drafted and signed by the New York Mets, McAnally played for one season in the Met farm system at the Class A level before Montreal selected him in the 1968 Major League Baseball expansion draft.

McAnally made the Major Leagues during the 1971 season and it proved to be his finest.  He reached career highs in victories (11), innings pitched (177), and complete games (8). After a slow start (1-7) which caused him to be farmed out briefly, and, possibly inspired by the Ernie McAnally Fan Club, he returned from the minors to become one of the best pitchers in the NL during the second half. All told he won 30 of 79 decisions (.380) in 112 career MLB games, with 351 strikeouts.

Sent to the Cleveland Indians after the 1974 season, he returned to the minor leagues for one year before leaving the game.

References

External links

1946 births
Living people
Baseball players from Texas
American expatriate baseball players in Canada
Major League Baseball pitchers
Montreal Expos players
Mankato Mets players
Visalia Mets players
Marion Mets players
Paris Dragons baseball players
West Palm Beach Expos players
Buffalo Bisons (minor league) players
Winnipeg Whips players
Oklahoma City 89ers players
People from Pittsburg, Texas
Florida Instructional League Mets players